Prince  was a Japanese politician and statesman who served as Prime Minister of Japan from 1906 to 1908 and from 1911 to 1912. He was elevated from marquis to prince in 1920. As the last surviving member of Japan's genrō, he was the most influential voice in Japanese politics from the mid-1920s to the early 1930s.

Early life
Kinmochi was born in Kyoto as the son of Udaijin Tokudaiji Kin'ito (1821–1883), head of a kuge family of court nobility. He was adopted by another kuge family, the Saionji, in 1851.  However, he grew up near his biological parents, since both the Tokudaiji and Saionji lived very near the Kyoto Imperial Palace. The young Saionji Kinmochi was frequently ordered to visit the palace as a playmate of the young prince who later became Emperor Meiji. Over time they became close friends. Kinmochi's biological brother Tokudaiji Sanetsune later became the Grand Chamberlain of Japan. Another younger brother was adopted into the very wealthy Sumitomo family and as Sumitomo Kichizaemon became the head of the Sumitomo zaibatsu. Sumitomo money largely financed Saionji's political career. His close relationship to the Imperial Court opened all doors to him. In his later political life, As the "last elder," he gave advice to the Taisho and Showa Emperors and had a great influence on the political world as a practical selector of prime ministers.

Kinmochi studied in Paris, France.

Meiji Restoration
As the heir of a noble family, Saionji participated in politics from an early age and was known for his brilliant talent. He took part in the climactic event of his time, the Boshin War, the revolution in Japan of 1867 and 1868, which overthrew the Tokugawa shogunate and installed the young Emperor Meiji as the (nominal) head of the government. Some noblemen at the Imperial Court considered the war to be a private dispute of the samurai of Satsuma and Chōshū against those of the Tokugawa. Saionji held the strong opinion that the nobles of the Imperial Court should seize the initiative and take part in the war. He participated in various battles as an imperial representative.

One of his first encounters involved taking Kameoka Castle without a fight. The next encounter was at Sasayama Castle. Several hundred Samurai from both sides met on the road nearby, but the defenders immediately surrendered. Then Fukuchiyama surrendered without a fight. By this time he had acquired an Imperial banner made by Iwakura Tomomi, featuring a sun and moon on a red field. Other Samurai did not want to attack the army with the imperial banner, and readily deserted the shōgun. After two weeks Saionji reached  Kitsuki, and following another bloodless encounter, Saionji returned to by ship to Osaka. Matters did eventually come to an end at Nagaoka Castle. However, Saionji was relieved from command in the actual battle and appointed governor of Echigo.

Overseas study tour

After the Meiji Restoration, Saionji resigned. With the support of Ōmura Masujirō he studied French in Tokyo. He left Japan on the SS Costa Rica with a group of thirty other Japanese students sailing to San Francisco. He traveled on to Washington, D.C. where he met Ulysses Grant, President of the United States of America. He then crossed the Atlantic, spent 13 days in London sightseeing, before finally arriving in Paris on 27 May 1871. Paris was in the turmoil of the Commune, and Paris was not safe for Saionji – indeed his tutor was shot when they stumbled upon a street battle. Saionji went to Switzerland and Nice, before settling in Marseilles, where he learned French with the accent of that city. He made his way to Paris following the suppression of the Commune. He studied law at the University of Paris and became involved with Émile Acollas, who had set up the Acollas Law School for foreign students studying law in Paris. These were the early years of the Third Republic, a time of high idealism in France. Saionji arrived in France with highly reactionary views but he was influenced by Acollas (a former member of the League of Peace and Freedom) and became the most liberal of Japanese major political figures of his generation. When the Iwakura Mission visited Paris in 1872, Iwakura was quite worried about the radicalism of Saionji and other Japanese students. He made many acquaintances in France, including Franz Liszt, the Goncourt brothers, and the fellow Sorbonne student Georges Clemenceau.

On his return to Japan, he founded Meiji Law School, which later evolved into Meiji University in 1880.

In 1882, Itō Hirobumi visited Europe to research the constitutional systems of each major European country, and he asked Saionji to accompany him, as they knew each other very well. After the trip, he was appointed ambassador to Austria-Hungary and later to Germany and Belgium.

Political career
Returning to Japan, Saionji joined the Privy Council, and served as vice president of the House of Peers. He also served as Minister of Education in the 2nd and 3rd Itō administrations (1894–1896, 1898) and 2nd Matsukata administration. During his tenure, he strove to improve the quality of the educational curriculum towards an international (i.e. western) standard.

In 1900, Itō founded the Rikken Seiyūkai political party, and Saionji joined as one of the first members. Due to his experiences in Europe, Saionji had a liberal political point of view and supported parliamentary government. He was one of the few early politicians who claimed that the majority party in parliament had to be the basis for forming a cabinet.

Saionji became president of the Privy Council in August 1900, and president of the Rikken Seiyūkai in 1903.

Prime Minister

From 7 January 1906, to 14 July 1908, and again from 30 August 1911, to 21 December 1912, Saionji served as Prime Minister of Japan.

Both his ministries were marked by continuing tension between Saionji and the powerful arch-conservative genrō, Field Marshal Yamagata Aritomo. Saionji and Itō saw political parties as a useful part of the machinery of government; Yamagata looked on political parties and all democratic institutions as quarrelsome, corrupt, and irrational.

Saionji had to struggle with the national budget with many demands and finite resources, Yamagata sought ceaselessly the greatest expansion of the army. Saionji's first cabinet was brought down in 1908 by conservatives led by Yamagata who were alarmed at the growth of socialism, who felt the government's suppression of socialists (after a parade and riots) had been insufficiently forceful.

The fall of Saionji's second cabinet was a major reverse to constitutional government. The Taishō Crisis (so named for the newly enthroned emperor) erupted in late November 1912, out of the continuing bitter dispute over the military budget. The army minister, General Uehara, unable to get the cabinet to agree on the army's demands, resigned. Saionji sought to replace Uehara.

A Japanese law (intended to give added power to the army and navy) required that the army minister must be a lieutenant general or general on active duty. All of the eligible generals, on Yamagata's instruction, refused to serve in Saionji's cabinet. The cabinet was then forced to resign. The precedent had been established that the army could force the resignation of a cabinet.

Saionji's political philosophy was heavily influenced by his background; he believed the Imperial Court should be guarded and that it should not participate directly in politics: the same strategy employed by noblemen and the Court in Kyoto for hundreds of years. This was another point in which he was opposed by nationalists in the Army, who wished for the Emperor to participate in Japanese politics directly and thus weaken both parliament and the cabinet. Nationalists also accused him of being a "globalist".

Elder statesman

Saionji was appointed a genrō in December 1912. The role of the genrō at this time was diminishing; their main function was to choose the prime ministers – formally, to nominate candidates for Prime Minister to the Emperor for approval, but no Emperor ever rejected their advice. From the death of Matsukata Masayoshi in 1924, Saionji was the sole surviving genrō. He exercised his prerogative of naming the prime ministers very nearly until his death in 1940 at the age of 91. Saionji, when he could, chose as prime minister the president of the majority party in the Diet, but his power was always constrained by the necessity of at least the tacit consent of the army and navy. He could choose political leaders only when they might be strong enough to form an effective government. He nominated military men and non-party politicians when he felt necessary.

In 1919, Saionji led the Japanese delegation at the Paris Peace Conference, though his role remained largely confined to a symbolic role due to ill health. During the negotiations, Saionji proposed the addition of a "racial equality clause" to the Covenant of the League of Nations, though this met with strong American and Australian resistance (both nations being racially segregated) and was not adopted. Saionji, by now an unmarried 70-year old, was accompanied to Paris by his son, his favorite daughter, and his current mistress. In 1920, he was given the title kōshaku (Prince) as an honor for a life in public service.

He was detested by Japanese militarists and was on the list of those to be assassinated in the attempted coup of February 26, 1936. Upon receiving news of the mutiny, Saionji fled in his car but was pursued for a great distance by a suspicious vehicle that he and his companions assumed held soldiers bent on his murder. In actuality, it held newspaper reporters.

For much of his career, Saionji tried to diminish the influence of the Imperial Japanese Army in political issues. He was one of the most liberal of Emperor Hirohito's advisors, and favored friendly relations with Great Britain and the United States. However, he was careful to pick his battles, and would concede defeat when he knew he could not win (e.g. his inability to prevent the Tripartite Pact).

Political scientist Kenneth Colegrove wrote in 1936 that Saionji had "extensive" influence over Japanese politics.

Honours
From the corresponding article in the Japanese Wikipedia

Titles
Count (7 July 1884)
Marquess  (xx1911)
Prince (7 September 1920)

Japanese decorations

 Grand Cordon of the Order of the Sacred Treasure (21 June 1895)
 Grand Cordon of the Order of the Rising Sun with Paulownia Flowers (14 September 1907)
 Grand Cordon of the Order of the Rising Sun (5 June 1896)
 Second Class of the Order of the Rising Sun (29 May 1888) 
 Third Class of the Order of the Rising Sun (11 March 1882)
 Collar of the Order of the Chrysanthemum (10 November 1928)
 Grand Cordon of the Order of the Chrysanthemum (21 December 1918)

Other decorations
 Knight Grand Cross of the Order of Pius IX (25 February 1888)
 Knight First Class of the Order of the Iron Crown (9 May 1888)
 Knight Grand Cross of the Order of the Netherlands Lion (16 March 1891)
 1st Class of the Order of the Red Eagle (15 October 1891)
 First Class of the Order of the Medjidie (8 March 1894)
 Order of the White Eagle (17 March 1896)
 Grand Cross of the Order of Charles III (10 November 1896)
 Honorary Knight Grand Cross of the Order of St. Michael and St. George (GCMG) (20 February 1906)
 Grand Cross of the Legion of Honour (23 October 1907)
 Order of St. Alexander Nevsky (30 October 1907)

Order of precedence
Junior First Rank (25 November 1940; posthumous)
Senior second rank (20 December 1898)
Second rank (11 December 1893)
Senior third rank (19 December 1878; restored)
Senior third rank (5 of 7th month 1862; relinquished 3rd of 7th 1869)
Third rank (25 April 1861)
Senior fourth rank, junior grade (5 February 1856)
Fourth rank, senior grade (22 January 1855)
Fourth rank, junior grade (22 January 1854)
Senior fifth rank, junior grade (21 January 1853)
Fifth rank, senior grade (27 December 1852)
Fifth rank, junior grade (early 1852)

Ancestry

See also
 List of Japanese ministers, envoys and ambassadors to Germany

References

Further reading
 Clements, Jonathan. Makers of the Modern World: Prince Saionji. Haus Publishing (2008). 
 Conners, Leslie. The Emperor's Adviser: Saionji Kinmochi and Pre-War Japanese Politics. Routledge Kegan & Paul. 
 Hackett, Roger F. Yamagata Aritomo in the Rise of Modern Japan. Harvard University Press (1971).
 Harada, Kumao. The Saionji-Harada memoirs, 1931–1940: Complete translation into English. University Publications of America (1978). ASIN: B000724T6W
 Oka Yoshitake, et al. Five Political Leaders of Modern Japan: Ito Hirobumi, Okuma Shigenobu, Hara Takashi, Inukai Tsuyoshi, and Saionji Kimmochi. University of Tokyo Press (1984).

External links

 

|-

|-

|-

1849 births
1940 deaths
20th-century prime ministers of Japan
20th-century Japanese politicians
Ambassadors of Japan to Austria-Hungary
Ambassadors of Japan to Belgium
Ambassadors of Japan to Germany
Ministers of Finance of Japan
Foreign ministers of Japan
Honorary Knights Grand Cross of the Order of St Michael and St George
Order of the Dannebrog
Japanese expatriates in France
Kazoku
Kuge
Meiji Restoration
Members of the House of Peers (Japan)
People of Meiji-period Japan
Prime Ministers of Japan
Recipients of the Order of the Paulownia Flowers
Recipients of the Order of the Rising Sun
Recipients of the Order of the Sacred Treasure
Rikken Seiyūkai politicians
Ritsumeikan University
Tokudaiji family
University of Paris alumni
University and college founders
Deified Japanese people
Politicians from Kyoto Prefecture